The Monticello Post Office is a historic post office building at 211 West Gaines Street in Monticello, Arkansas.  The single story brick Art Deco brick building was built in 1937.  In 1941 a terra cotta sculpture by Berta Margoulies entitled "Tomato Sculpture" was installed in the building, which was funded in part by Section of Painting and Sculpture of the United States Department of the Treasury.

The building was listed on the National Register of Historic Places in 1998.

See also 

National Register of Historic Places listings in Drew County, Arkansas
List of United States post offices

References

External links 
Encyclopedia of Arkansas History & Culture entry

Post office buildings on the National Register of Historic Places in Arkansas
Art Deco architecture in Arkansas
Government buildings completed in 1937
National Register of Historic Places in Drew County, Arkansas
Individually listed contributing properties to historic districts on the National Register in Arkansas
1937 establishments in Arkansas